Paul Hauman (13 August 1883 – 21 February 1978) was a Norwegian footballer. He played in one match for the Norway national football team in 1908.

References

External links
 

1883 births
1978 deaths
Norwegian footballers
Norway international footballers
Place of birth missing
Association footballers not categorized by position